Douglas Thomas Munro (7 February 1917 – 18 September 1989) was an Australian rules footballer who played with Essendon in the Victorian Football League (VFL).

Family
The son of Douglas Sutherland Bennett Munro (1892-1953), and Julia Catherine Munro (1885-1980), née Herlihy, Douglas Thomas Munro was born at South Melbourne, Victoria on 7 February 1917.

He married Edna Elsie Wilson (1909-2000) in 1939.

Football

Essendon (VFL)
He was cleared from Ascot Vale to Essendon Seconds in 1935, and was listed to train with the Essendon Second XVIII in April 1936.

Injured at the beginning of the 1937 season, his only senior game for Essendon was in the final home-and-away match of the 1937 season, against South Melbourne, at the Lake Oval on 28 August 1937.

Fitzroy (VFL)
He was cleared from Essendon to Fitzroy on 6 July 1939.

Notes

References
 
 Maplestone, M., Flying Higher: History of the Essendon Football Club 1872–1996, Essendon Football Club, (Melbourne), 1996.

External links 
		

1917 births
1989 deaths
Australian rules footballers from Melbourne
Essendon Football Club players
People from South Melbourne